Halloran is a sparsely populated suburb of the Central Coast region of New South Wales, Australia, located off the Sydney-Newcastle Freeway between Wyong and Morisset. It is part of the  local government area.

Suburbs of the Central Coast (New South Wales)